Sarkhun or Sar Khun or Sorkhun may refer to:
 Sar Khun, Chaharmahal and Bakhtiari
 Sarkhun, Hormozgan
 Sar Khun, Kohgiluyeh and Boyer-Ahmad
 Sorkhun, Kohgiluyeh and Boyer-Ahmad
 Sarkhun, South Khorasan
 Sarkhun Rural District, in Hormozgan Province